is a professional Japanese baseball player. He is a pitcher for the Chiba Lotte Marines of Nippon Professional Baseball (NPB).

References 

1997 births
Living people
Nippon Professional Baseball pitchers
Baseball people from Hokkaido
Sportspeople from Sapporo
Chiba Lotte Marines players